Pihlajavesi may refer to the following places in Finland:
Pihlajavesi (Saimaa), a major basin in Saimaa
Pihlajavesi, Keuruu, former municipality and current northwestern part of Keuruu
Pihlajavesi (Keuruu), a lake in Pihlajavesi, Keuruu